Georges Beuchat (11 February 1910 – 20 October 1991) was a French inventor, underwater diver, businessman and emblematic pioneer of underwater activities and founder of Beuchat. Throughout his lifetime, Beuchat never ceased developing products which have significantly enhanced underwater activity as we know it today. Many of his inventions and innovations have gone down in history, including the surface buoy in 1948, the first underwater camera housing in 1950, and the first vented fins (the Jetfins in 1964).

Beuchat inventions

1947: Tarzan Speargun
1948: Surface Buoy
1950: Tarzan camera housing
1950: Tarzan calf sheath for diving knife
1953: First isothermic (foam rubber) diving suit
1954: Split strap for diving mask.
1958: Compensator (single-window mask)
1959: Tarzan fin grips (3-way straps securing closed-heel fins on feet)
1960: Espadon nervure fins
1960: Espadon Record fins with blades featuring parallel longitudinal ribs
1963: Tarzan wetsuit
1964: Jetfins (1st vented fins. 100,000 units sold in the first few years)
1964: Souplair regulator 
1975: Marlin speargun
1978: Atmos regulator

Distinction
Georges Beuchat received the Exportation Award in 1961.

References

External links 

 Corporate website

20th-century French inventors
Diving engineers
French underwater divers
1910 births
1991 deaths